Gasherbrum is a remote group of peaks situated at the northeastern end of the Baltoro Glacier in the Karakoram mountain range. The peaks are located within the border region of Xinjiang, China and Gilgit-Baltistan, Pakistan. The massif contains three of the world's 8,000 metre peaks (if Broad Peak is included). Although the word "Gasherbrum" is often claimed to mean "Shining Wall", presumably a reference to the highly visible face of Gasherbrum IV, it comes from "rgasha" (beautiful) + "brum" (mountain) in Balti, hence it actually means "beautiful mountain".

Geography

History 
In 1856, Thomas George Montgomerie, a British Royal Engineers lieutenant and a member of the Great Trigonometric Survey of India, sighted a group of high peaks in the Karakoram from more than 200 km away. He named five of these peaks K1, K2, K3, K4 and K5, where the "K" denotes Karakoram. Today, K1 is known as Masherbrum, K3 as Gasherbrum IV, K4 as Gasherbrum II and K5 as Gasherbrum I. Only K2, the second highest mountain in the world, has retained Montgomerie's name.  Broad Peak was thought to miss out on a K-number as it was hidden from Montgomerie's view by the Gasherbrum group.

Climbing history

See also
Concordia, Pakistan
Eight-thousander
List of highest mountains
List of mountains in Pakistan

Sources
H. Adams Carter, "Balti Place Names in the Karakoram", American Alpine Journal 49 (1975), p. 53.
Mount Qogori (K2) {scale 1:100,000}; edited and mapped by Mi Desheng (Lanzhou Institute of Glaciology and Geocryology), the Xi´an Cartographic Publishing House.
Dreams of Tibet: the pundits

References

Mountain ranges of the Karakoram
Mountains of Gilgit-Baltistan